The Open Dynamics Engine (ODE) is a physics engine written in C/C++. Its two main components are a rigid body dynamics simulation engine and a collision detection engine. It is free software licensed both under the BSD license and the LGPL.

ODE was started in 2001 and has already been used in many applications and games, such as Assetto Corsa, BloodRayne 2, Call of Juarez, S.T.A.L.K.E.R., Titan Quest, World of Goo, X-Moto and OpenSimulator.

Overview
The Open Dynamics Engine is used for simulating the dynamic interactions between bodies in space. It is not tied to any particular graphics package although it includes a basic one called drawstuff. It supports several geometries: box, sphere, capsule (cylinder capped with hemispheres), triangle mesh, cylinder and heightmap.

Simulation
Higher level environments that allow non-programmers access to ODE include Player Project, Webots, Opensimulator, anyKode Marilou and V-REP.

ODE is a popular choice for robotics simulation applications, with scenarios such as mobile robot locomotion and simple grasping. ODE has some drawbacks in this field, for example the method of approximating friction and poor support for joint-damping.

See also

 OPAL – the Open Physics Abstraction Layer, originally built on top of ODE
 Physics Abstraction Layer – The original Physics Abstraction Layer
 Newton Game Dynamics
 Bullet – another open source physics engine used in commercial games and movies
 Chipmunk – a similar physics engine intended for 2D applications
 Vortex (software)
 Project Chrono

References

External links
 Bitbucket: ODE project page
 Open Dynamics Engine (ODE) Community Wiki
 (Old) Official ODE Homepage
 (Obsolete) Python-ODE Bindings (pyode)
 The ode4j project, a Java port of ODE
 The ODE.NET project, a C# wrapper for ODE

Computer physics engines
Free computer libraries
Software using the BSD license